John B. Kehl (December 14, 1837 – September 12, 1909) was an American merchant, miller, logger and banker from Wisconsin who served a one-year term as a member of the Wisconsin State Assembly from Dane County before eventually settling in Chippewa Falls.

Background 
Kehl was born December 14, 1837 in Schwabsburg near Oppenheim in Hesse-Darmstadt, the son of Peter Kehl, who came to Milwaukee in April, 1845, remaining there about five months, then settled with his family in Sauk City. They lived there until 1855, when they moved to the town of Roxbury in Dane County. The elder Kehl began practicing viniculture in 1850, becoming the pioneer of that industry in Wisconsin.

In July, 1860, Kehl went into the mercantile business for himself. In 1866 Kehl switched from being a merchant to milling, doing commercial and custom milling at Blue Mounds. He settled in Vermont, Wisconsin.

Public office 
Having held several local office, Kehl was elected to the Assembly for a one-year term in 1873, representing the Third District of Dane County (the Towns of Towns of Berry, Black Earth, Cross Plains, Dane, Mazomanie, Roxbury, Springfield, Vermont, Vienna and Westport). He was elected as a Democrat, with 1,162 votes, to 598 for Republican W. N. Hawes (the incumbent, Democrat Otto Kerl, was not a candidate); but in the 1874 Wisconsin Blue Book chose to list himself as a "Conservative Democrat", to distinguish himself from the majority of Wisconsin Democratic legislators who had affiliated with the Reform Party, a short-lived coalition of Democrats, reform and Liberal Republicans, and Grangers formed in 1873, which had secured the election of William Robert Taylor as Governor of Wisconsin, as well as electing a number of state legislators. He was the only Democrat to do so. He was assigned to the standing committee on state affairs.

Having left Dane County by the time of the 1874 election, he was not a candidate for re-election; he was succeeded by fellow Democrat David Ford.

In the spring of 1874, Kehl came to Chippewa Falls and began construction of the Glen Mills, one and a half miles from Chippewa Falls. In the winter of 1875-76, he went into logging, and continued logging operations in connection with his other affairs. He operated the Glen Flouring Mills for A. E. Pound & Co., from 1876 to 1878, when he purchased the business for himself. In 1875, he became interested in the First National Bank as stockholder and director, and became vice-president of the bank. He had extensive investments in real estate in Dane and Sauk counties, and was a director of the company that published the Chippewa County Independent.

Personal life 
Kehl was married in Livingston, New Jersey on September 9, 1863, to Susie F. Wright, a native of that town, born in 1840. They had three children (Jessie I., Ida Stella, and Frederick W.). John Kehl was a member of the German Reformed Church. He died on September 12, 1909.

References

External links 
Listing for the Kehl's home at 501 W. Grand Avenue in Chippewa Falls, part of the Wisconsin Architecture and History Inventory Collection of the Wisconsin Historical Society.

1837 births
American bankers
American loggers
Businesspeople from Wisconsin
Hessian emigrants to the United States
Democratic Party members of the Wisconsin State Assembly
Millers
Politicians from Chippewa Falls, Wisconsin
People from the Landgraviate of Hesse-Darmstadt
1909 deaths
People from Dane County, Wisconsin
People from Sauk City, Wisconsin
19th-century American politicians
19th-century American businesspeople